Joshua "Josh" Francou (born 7 August 1974) is a former professional Australian rules footballer in the Australian Football League (AFL). He is currently serving as an assistant coach at the Gold Coast Suns.

Port Adelaide (1997–2006)
Debuting with Port Adelaide as a 22-year-old, Francou was part of Port Adelaide's inaugural team. He was one of the club's best players, playing every game, averaging a respectable 15 disposals per game as well as kicking 16 goals for the year. He played every game the next season also, averaging 16 disposals. In the 1999 season, Francou missed out on just three games. Port Adelaide played in their first final in that year, losing to the Kangaroos by 44 points.

The 2000 season was a good one for Francou, averaging 22 creative disposals a match. He continued to average over 20 disposals the next season, kicking 7 goals in both years. In 2002, he once again averaged over 20 disposals, and for the first time since 1998, played in all games.

Injuries and retirement (2003–2006)
In his early career in the SANFL, Francou dislocated his left knee so badly, that it bent 90 degrees, which forced him out of the game for over a year. In recent times, he has been ravaged with knee-reconstructions, one in just his second game of the year in 2003, and then another injury to his other good knee in Pre-Season 2004. He was able to play every game except one in 2005 (despite battling osteitis pubis). He injured both his left and right knee.

On 23 August  2006, Francou announced his retirement after playing only 23 games since his knee reconstruction in 2003, and no games in his final year (2006).

Since retirement (2006– )
Josh joined radio station 5AA, replacing Russell Ebert as special comments commentator. He also wrote for the Adelaide Advertiser.

Josh Francou has also worked as a part-time Physical Education teacher at Banksia Park International High School and Pulteney Grammar School in South Australia – and taught full-time at Prince Alfred College and  St Peter's College, Adelaide.

Josh is an assistant coach at the Gold Coast Suns in the AFL, joining in 2019. Josh has also been an assistant coach for both Sydney Swans and the Adelaide Crows.

Statistics

|-
|- style="background-color: #EAEAEA"
! scope="row" style="text-align:center" | 1997
|style="text-align:center;"|
| 10 || 22 || 16 || 15 || 214 || 122 || 336 || 54 || 44 || 0.7 || 0.7 || 9.7 || 5.5 || 15.3 || 2.5 || 2.0 || 1
|-
! scope="row" style="text-align:center" | 1998
|style="text-align:center;"|
| 10 || 22 || 12 || 15 || 243 || 154 || 397 || 50 || 54 || 0.5 || 0.7 || 11.0 || 7.0 || 18.0 || 2.3 || 2.5 || 7
|- style="background-color: #EAEAEA"
! scope="row" style="text-align:center" | 1999
|style="text-align:center;"|
| 10 || 20 || 10 || 8 || 224 || 168 || 392 || 42 || 48 || 0.5 || 0.4 || 11.2 || 8.4 || 19.6 || 2.1 || 2.4 || 6
|-
! scope="row" style="text-align:center" | 2000
|style="text-align:center;"|
| 10 || 20 || 7 || 10 || 237 || 192 || 429 || 34 || 46 || 0.4 || 0.5 || 11.9 || 9.6 || 21.5 || 1.7 || 2.3 || 8
|- style="background-color: #EAEAEA"
! scope="row" style="text-align:center" | 2001
|style="text-align:center;"|
| 10 || 22 || 7 || 7 || 308 || 224 || 532 || 67 || 81 || 0.3 || 0.3 || 14.0 || 10.2 || 24.2 || 3.0 || 3.7 || 19
|-
! scope="row" style="text-align:center" | 2002
|style="text-align:center;"|
| 10 || 25 || 13 || 13 || 259 || 269 || 528 || 42 || 100 || 0.5 || 0.5 || 10.4 || 10.8 || 21.1 || 1.7 || 4.0 || 21
|- style="background-color: #EAEAEA"
! scope="row" style="text-align:center" | 2003
|style="text-align:center;"|
| 10 || 2 || 0 || 0 || 8 || 15 || 23 || 4 || 5 || 0.0 || 0.0 || 4.0 || 7.5 || 11.5 || 2.0 || 2.5 || 0
|-
! scope="row" style="text-align:center" | 2004
|style="text-align:center;"|
| 10 || 0 || — || — || — || — || — || — || — || — || — || — || — || — || — || — || —
|- style="background-color: #EAEAEA"
! scope="row" style="text-align:center" | 2005
|style="text-align:center;"|
| 10 || 23 || 7 || 13 || 179 || 204 || 383 || 70 || 82 || 0.3 || 0.6 || 7.8 || 8.9 || 16.7 || 3.0 || 3.6 || 5
|- class="sortbottom"
! colspan=3| Career
! 156
! 72
! 81
! 1672
! 1348
! 3020
! 363
! 460
! 0.5
! 0.5
! 10.7
! 8.6
! 19.4
! 2.3
! 2.9
! 67
|}

References

External links

1974 births
Australian rules footballers from South Australia
Australian people of Greek descent
Port Adelaide Football Club players
Port Adelaide Football Club players (all competitions)
North Adelaide Football Club players
North Adelaide Football Club coaches
South Australian State of Origin players
All-Australians (AFL)
Magarey Medal winners
South Australian Football Hall of Fame inductees
Living people
Australia international rules football team players